Robbert Baruch (Amsterdam, 12 October 1967) is a Dutch lobbyist, public administrator and former PvdA politician in the Netherlands. From 2006 to 2009 he was the Deputy Mayor and Alderman on behalf of the PvdA in the Rotterdam borough of Feijenoord. From 2012 to 2021 he was Manager Public Affairs in Buma/Stemra.  In 2021 Baruch held the role of Senior Vice President Public Affairs, Europe to Universal Music Group (UMG).

Biography 
He writes the longest running political blog in the Netherlands and was a member of the Provincial Council of South Holland from 2003 to 2007. As the PvdA candidate, he took the role of Deputy Mayor and Alderman in Rotterdam borough of Feijenoord From 2006 to 2009. In 2013 he was candidate for ballot leader for PvdA at the 2014 European elections

Throughout his life, Baruch had embraced the importance of the local communities and social inclusion initiatives. He led many initiatives to renaming streets and public spaces after local heroes. In the Afrikaanderwijk neighbourhood of Rotterdam, He initiated renaming streets after Afrikaners from the Boer Wars to more current and diverse politicians. He also informally named a sports park there after the local Hip-Hop artist Helderheid. In 2021 the Rotterdam Municipality formalised this and officially named the park Helderheidplein.  
He defended the role of mosques committees in mitigating poverty issues and public safety and helped Muslim groups in Feijenoord to qualify for municipal funds by widening the beneficiary base of their social activities projects. He lobbied for the preservation of Jewish and Muslim ritual slaughter. In 2013 he was one of the PvdA candidates for the party leader at the European elections.

In 2021 Baruch held the role of Senior Vice President Public Affairs, Europe to Universal Music Group (UMG). From 2012 to 2021 he was manager Public Affairs at Buma/Stemra, the Dutch collective management society for composers and music publishers. During COVID-19 pandemic, Robbert has led the efforts of the Emergency Fund and the Investment Fund for Dutch composers, lyricists and music publishers.

References

1967 births
Living people
21st-century Dutch politicians
Aldermen of a Rotterdam borough
Dutch campaign managers
Dutch Jews
Dutch lobbyists
Dutch political consultants
Jewish Dutch politicians
Labour Party (Netherlands) politicians
Leiden University alumni
Members of the Provincial Council of South Holland
Politicians from Amsterdam